Chloë Cheese (born 1952) is an English illustrator, painter and print-maker.

Cheese was born in London, the daughter of artist and printmaker Bernard Cheese (1925-2013) and artist and illustrator Sheila Robinson (1925-1988). Her childhood was spent in Great Bardfield, Essex, where her parents were among a group known as the Great Bardfield Artists. She studied at Cambridge School of Art (now Anglia Ruskin University) and the Royal College of Art.

Examples of her work are held in several public collections including those of Tate Britain, Victoria and Albert Museum, and the Museum of London. The Fry Art Gallery in Saffron Walden holds many of her works, as well as those of her father.

In 1985 the British Council included her work, and her name, in a travelling exhibition: "British Illustration from Caxton to Chloë".

She has illustrated books including Antonio Carluccio's A Passion for Pasta (1993,) and Walking the Bridge of your Nose, a children's poetry book selected by Michael Rosen (1994,).

References

External links

  

1952 births
Living people
20th-century English women artists
21st-century English women artists
Alumni of Anglia Ruskin University
Alumni of the Royal College of Art
English printmakers
Women printmakers
English illustrators
British women illustrators